Rick van der Meer (born 14 June 1997) is a Dutch footballer who plays for Katwijk in the Dutch Tweede Divisie.

Club career
He made his professional debut in the Eerste Divisie for Jong FC Utrecht on 5 August 2016 in a game against NAC Breda.

International
He was on the roster of the Netherlands national under-17 football team for the 2014 UEFA European Under-17 Championship, where Netherlands came as the runners-up. However, he was an unused substitute for every game in the tournament.

References

External links
 
 

1997 births
Living people
Dutch footballers
Feyenoord players
Jong FC Utrecht players
VV Katwijk players
Eerste Divisie players
Tweede Divisie players
Netherlands youth international footballers
Association football defenders
Footballers from Schiedam